The Kalmyk deportations of 1943, codename Operation Ulusy was the Soviet deportation of more than 93,000 people of Kalmyk nationality, and non-Kalmyk women with Kalmyk husbands, on 28–31 December 1943. Families and individuals were forcibly relocated in cattle wagons to special settlements for forced labor in Siberia. Kalmyk women married to non-Kalmyk men were exempted from the deportations. The government's official reason for the deportation was an accusation of Axis collaboration during World War II based on the approximately 5,000 Kalmyks who fought in the Nazi-affiliated Kalmykian Cavalry Corps. The government refused to acknowledge that more than 23,000 Kalmyks served in the Red Army and fought against Axis forces at the same time.
 
NKVD chief Lavrentiy Beria and his deputy commissar Ivan Serov implemented the forced relocation on direct orders from Soviet Premier Joseph Stalin. Up to 10,000 servicemen from the NKVD-NKGB troops participated in the deportation. It was part of the Soviet forced settlement program and population transfers that affected several million Soviet citizens from ethnic minority groups between the 1930s and the 1950s. The specific targeting of Kalmyks was based on a number of factors, including the group's alleged anti-communist sentiment and Buddhist culture.

The deportation contributed to more than 16,000 deaths, resulting in a 17% mortality rate for the deported population. The Kalmyks were rehabilitated in 1956 after Nikita Khrushchev became the new Soviet Premier and undertook a process of de-Stalinization. In 1957, the Kalmyks were released from special settlements and allowed to return to their home region, which was formalized as the Kalmyk Autonomous Soviet Socialist Republic. By 1959, more than 60% of the remaining Kalmyks had returned home. The loss of life and socioeconomic upheaval of the deportations, however, had a profound impact on the Kalmyks that is still felt today. On 14 November 1989 the Supreme Council of the Soviet Union declared all of Stalin's deportations "illegal and criminal". Contemporary historical analyses consider these deportations an example of persecution and a crime against humanity.

Background

In the 1630s, several Oirat tribes from the west Mongolia and Dzungaria regions migrated further west, settling along the Volga river and eventually becoming a differentiated ethnic group called the Kalmyks. The Kalmyks spoke a Mongolian dialect and practiced Tibetan Buddhism.

The Kalmyks became part of the Russian Empire and during the subsequent Russian Civil War, many of them fought with the anti-communist White Russian army. When the Bolsheviks prevailed, many Kalmyks left Russia in 1920, with a significant proportion emigrating to Yugoslavia and Bulgaria.  The Kalmyks who remained in the newly formed Soviet Union resisted the collectivization process of its agricultural and herding practices in the 1920s, forming guerrilla groups that continued to fight until 1926.

In the 1920s, Joseph Stalin emerged as the new General Secretary of the Communist Party of the Soviet Union. Ben Kiernan, an American academic and historian, described Stalin's era as "by far the bloodiest of Soviet or even Russian history". In the 1930s, the Soviet government initiated an anti-religious campaign against Kalmyk Buddhism. Of the 175 Buddhist temples registered in the Russian Empire in 1917, all were destroyed by 1940. In 1935, the Soviet government established the Kalmyk Autonomous Soviet Socialist Republic with Elista serving as the capital. According to the 1939 Soviet census, 131,271 Kalmyks were registered in the USSR. An alternative source lists 134,400 Kalmyks during that time.

In September and October 1937, around 172,000 Soviet Koreans were deported, making it the first instance of Stalin's policy of resettling an entire nationality.

During World War II, Nazi Germany invaded the Soviet Union in June 1941. On 26 August 1942, Nazi forces captured Elista in Kalmykia and soon after established the Kalmykian Cavalry Corps, consisting of approximately 5,000 men under the leadership of former intelligence officer Dr. Rudolf Otto Doll. The Corps fought against the Red Army, Soviet partisans and protected Kalmyk livestock from Soviet forces. At the same time, 23,540 Kalmyks served in the Red Army and eight were ultimately awarded recognition as Heroes of the Soviet Union. Thus, Kalmyks fought on both sides in World War II. Around a quarter of the Kalmyk population fled across the Volga river to escape the German occupation. The fighting resulted in the destruction of many buildings and widespread looting, with total damages in the region estimated to be as high as 1,070,324,789 Rbls. When the German forces withdrew, many Kalmyks evacuated with them. The Red Army recaptured Elista on 31 December 1942. Once back under Soviet control, the Kalmyks were accused of being disloyal and fighting alongside Axis forces.

Deportation

During World War II, eight ethnic groups were expelled from their native lands by the Soviet government: the Volga Germans, the Chechens, the Ingush, the Balkars, the Karachays, the Crimean Tatars, the Meskhetian Turks and the Kalmyks. Approximately 650,000 people were deported from the Caucasus region  in 1943 and 1944 and a total of 3,332,589 people were deported during the entire war.

Lavrentiy Beria, head of the Soviet secret police, championed the Kalmyk deportation, stating that the Kalmyks were "unreliable". The decision was formally advanced by the State Defense Committee and approved by Stalin in October 1943. On 27 October 1943, NKVD deputy Ivan Serov arrived in Elista to begin preparations for the mass deportation. He met local party members at the office of the former First Secretary of the Kalmyk Communist Party and announced that the Kalmyks would be deported. When asked for the reason, Serov stated that it was because the Kalmyks "left the front and joined the Germans". That same month, NKVD deputy V.V. Chernyshov held a meeting in Moscow with NKVD representatives from Altai, Krasnoyarsk, Omsk and Novosibirsk to discuss the resettlement of the Kalmyks to these areas. The Kalmyk region, including its largest town of Elista, was divided into several operative districts. An NKVD operative was assigned to each district and required to develop plans to carry out the deportations, including mapping railway routes and identifying the number of trucks and soldiers necessary.

On 27 December, the Kalmyk Autonomous Soviet Socialist Republic was formally abolished by the Soviet government. Parts of its former territory were assigned to Astrakhan, Stalingrad, Rostov, Stavropol, and Dagestan. The former capital of Elista was renamed to Stepnoy. Resolution No. 1432 425 of the Soviet of People's Commissars, formally determining the resettlement of the Kalmyks, was adopted on 28 December 1943. It was signed by Vyacheslav Molotov but not made public.

On the morning of 28 December 1943, NKVD agents entered the homes of the Kalmyks and announced the Decree of the Presidium of the Supreme Soviet, requiring the immediate deportation of Kalmyks to Siberia. The Decree included formal accusations of Nazi collaboration, anti-Soviet acts, and terrorism. The Kalmyks were given 12 hours to pack their belongings. Soviet soldiers searched the Kalmyk houses and confiscated firearms, anti-Soviet literature, and foreign currency. Every person of Kalmyk ethnicity, including women, children and the elderly, were loaded onto trucks and sent to nearby railway stations. Only non-Kalmyks and Kalmyk women married to men of ethnic groups, not subject to deportation, were allowed to stay. Soviet forces surrounded Kalmyk settlements from the outset to prevent any potential resistance. At the start of the deportation, 750 Kalmyks were arrested as "gang members" or "anti-Soviet elements".
 

The Soviet government initially employed 4,421 NKVD agents, 1,226 soldiers, and 1,355 trucks as part of the operation. This number increased to 10,000 servicemen from the NKVD-NKGB troops, diverted from the Eastern Front. State Security Major General Markeyev, the Ivanovo Oblast NKVD Chief, oversaw the deportation.

The deportation was given the code name "Operation Ulusy" and affected 93,139 Kalmyks, including 26,359 families. Only three Kalmyk families avoided deportation. The operation proceeded as planned, with no security incidents reported. The Kalmyks were packed into cattle carts and loaded onto 46 east-bound trains. They were sent on a journey to remote areas of over a thousand miles away. One witness recalled that they traveled for two weeks, with no opportunity to practice basic hygiene. Another witness described that the children slept on the bunks, while the grown ups slept on the floor of the wagons. They made a hole on the floor, placed suitcases around it and used it as a toilet. Meals were available, though only once per day. Some deportees shared their food during the long transit. The trains would occasionally stop to release the people inside, though only for a short amount of time. The deportation was completed on 31 December. A majority of them (91,919) were deported by the end of the year, though an additional 1,014 people were also evicted in January 1944. The entire operation was guided by Beria and Serov. Other officials who participated in it included Victor Grigorievich Nasedkin, Head of the Gulag and Commissar of the State Security of the 3rd degree, and Dmitri Vasilevich Arkadiev, the Head of the Transport Department of the USSR NKVD. The Kalmyks were sent to various locations in Siberia—by January 1944, 24,352 had been sent to the Omsk Oblast, 21,164 to Krasnoyarsk Krai, 20,858 to Altai Krai, and 18,333 to Novosibirsk Oblast. Alternative sources indicate that, beginning in 1944, 6,167 Kalmyk families were in the Altai, 7,525 in the Krasnoyarsk, 5,435 in Novosibirsk and 8,353 in the Omsk Region. 660 families were also located in the Tomsk Region, 648 in the Kazakh Soviet Socialist Republic, 522 in Tobolsk, 2,796 in the Yamalo-Nenets Autonomous Okrug and 1,760 in the  Khanty-Mansi Autonomous Okrug.

Historian Nikolay Bugay described the deportation as involving four distinct stages: (1) deportations in the Kalmyk region; (2) deportations in the Rostov Region; (3) deportations in the Stalingrad region; and (4) deportations of active duty Kalmyks serving in the Red Army. The final stage took place between 1944 and 1948, and involved not only Kalmyks, but also the Karaychs, Meskhetian Turks, Crimean Tatars, Chechens, Ingush and Balkars serving in the Red Army — all were discharged and exiled to the special settlements. Ethnic Russians were settled in the previously Kalmyk areas, changing their identity.

The Presidium of the Supreme Soviet issued a decree on 26 November 1948, titled "On Criminal Accountability for Escapes from Places of Compulsory and Permanent Settlement by Persons Exiled to Remote Regions of the Soviet Union during the Period of the Great Patriotic War". The decree formally stated that all deported ethnic groups must remain in permanent exile.

Exile and death toll
The Kalmyks were placed under the administration of the special settlements. These settlements provided forced labor for underdeveloped and inhospitable regions of the Soviet Union. Deportees routinely worked twelve hours a day, seven days a week. They suffered from exhaustion, cold, and hunger, with food rations tied to work quotas.

Upon arrival at the camps, male and female deportees were separated, washed, and forced to line up outside in the winter cold.  Living conditions were minimal and cramped, with many having to share beds and sleep on the floor.  45,985 Kalmyk deportees were registered as laborers, including 28,107 in the agriculture sector, 1,632 in the mining and gold extraction industry, 784 in coal mining, and 259 in the timber industry.

Of the 93,139 deported Kalmyks, approximately 1,400 died in transit and a similar number became gravely ill. Hunger, cold, work conditions, and infections resulted in many additional fatalities at the forced labor camps. Soviet sources indicate that 83,688 Kalmyks were registered in the special settlements as of early 1945, meaning that more than 13,000 people had died or disappeared in the first two years of the deportation. In 1945, 3,735 Kalmyk children died (a 9.3 percent mortality rate) while only 351 Kalmyk children were born.

Official Soviet archives recorded approximately 16,000 deaths among the deported Kalmyks, a more than 17% mortality rate. Unofficial NKVD estimates placed the mortality rate even higher, at 19%.

Of the ethnic groups subjected to forced deportation by Soviet authorities, the Kalmyks suffered the greatest relative losses. The 1959 census listed 106,100 Kalmyks, down from 134,400 as of the 1939 census, meaning a more than 20% decline within a single generation.

Rehabilitation, return and legacy
 
On 13 December 1953, a Kalmyk delegation headed by Djab Naminov-Burkhinov lodged a formal complaint with the UN Secretary-General Dag Hammarskjöld. After Stalin's death in 1953, Nikita Khrushchev started a process of de-Stalinization, reversing many of previous policies. In his secret speech on 24 February 1956, Khrushchev condemned the ethnic deportations:

In August 1953, the Central Committee of the Communist Party of the Soviet Union overturned the decree of the Presidium of the Supreme Soviet from 1948, which ordered that all the evicted ethnic groups must remain in permanent exile. The Kalmyks were officially released from special settlement supervision on 17 March 1956. On 9 January 1957, a Soviet decree established the Kalmyk Autonomous Oblast and on 29 July 1958, it officially became the Kalmyk Autonomous Soviet Socialist Republic. 

By 1959, more than 60% of deported Kalmyks had returned to their home region. By 1989, nearly 85% of Soviet Kalmyks resided in Kalmykia. However, the deportations permanently altered the ethnic composition of the region, reducing the number of ethnic Kalmyks in the population from 75% in 1926 to 45% in 1989. Many Kalmyks were grateful to Khrushchev for restoring their lands, and a street in Elista was named in his honor.

On 14 November 1989 the Supreme Council of the Soviet Union declared all of Stalin's deportations "illegal and criminal". On 26April 1991 the Supreme Soviet of the Russian Socialist Federal Soviet Republic, under its chairman Boris Yeltsin, followed suit and passed the law On the Rehabilitation of Repressed Peoples with Article 2 denouncing all mass deportations as "Stalin's policy of defamation and genocide". Russian historian Pavel Polian considered all the deportations of entire ethnic groups during Stalin's era, including those from the Caucasus, a crime against humanity. 

Historian Alexander Nekrich concluded that, while there were some Kalmyks who collaborated with Nazi Germany, "the majority of Kalmyks  not only remained loyal to the system but fought to defend it, arms in hands". Professor Brian Glyn Williams concluded that the deportation of the Meskhetian Turks, in spite of their lands never coming close to the scene of combat during World War II and which coincided with the deportation of other ethnic groups from Caucasus and Crimea, lends the strongest evidence that all the deportations were a part of a larger concealed Soviet foreign policy rather than a response to any "universal mass treason". Scholar Nelly Bekus assumes that one of the motivations for the Soviet forced transfer was the Russification of these areas. Historians Hugo Service and Curtis Richardson described the deportation as an example of Soviet "ethnic cleansing", with Service opining it aimed to "stigmatize particular ethnic groups as posing a special danger to the Soviet state"

In its 1991 report, Human Rights Watch described all of the Soviet mass deportations as a form of collective punishment since groups were targeted on the basis of their ethnicity. It also noted that none of these ethnic groups were given any kind of compensation for the harm caused by the deportations. Social anthropologist Valeriya Gazizova similarly concluded that the Kalmyks were subject to Soviet persecution.

In 2012, over 1,800 Kalmyks filed a request for compensation from the government as victims of the deportation. The Elista City Court rejected their application.

See also
 Political repression in the Soviet Union
 Deportation of Koreans in the Soviet Union
 Soviet war crimes
 Persecution of Buddhists
 Buddhism in Kalmykia

References

Bibliography

Books
 
 
 
  
  
 
 
 
 
 
 
 
 
 
 
 
 
 
 
 
 
 
 

 
 
 
 
 
 
 
 
 

Journals

 

 

 
 
 

Other
 
 
 
 

1943 in the Soviet Union
Crimes against humanity
Ethnic cleansing in Europe
Kalmyks
History of Kalmykia
Persecution of Buddhists
Persecution of Mongols
Political repression in the Soviet Union
Soviet World War II crimes